In general topology, a branch of mathematics, the integer broom topology is an example of a topology on the so-called integer broom space X.

Definition of the integer broom space 

The integer broom space X is a subset of the plane R2. Assume that the plane is parametrised by polar coordinates. The integer broom contains the origin and the points  such that n is a non-negative integer and }, where Z+ is the set of positive integers. Geometrically, the space consists of a collection of convergent sequences. For a fixed n, we have a sequence of points − lying on circle with centre (0, 0) and radius n − that converges to the point (n, 0).

Definition of the integer broom topology 
We define the topology on X by means of a product topology. The integer broom space is given by the polar coordinates

Let us write  for simplicity. The integer broom topology on X is the product topology induced by giving U the right order topology, and V the subspace topology from R.

Properties 

The integer broom space, together with the integer broom topology, is a compact topological space. It is a T0 space, but it is neither a T1 space nor a Hausdorff space. The space is path connected, while neither locally connected nor  arc connected.

See also 

 Comb space
 Infinite broom
 List of topologies

References 

General topology
Topological spaces